Simon Loxley is a British graphic designer and bestselling author.

Life 

He was born and raised in London.

Career 

He has worked for the National Portrait Gallery, Museum of London, the Geffrye Museum, the Maritime Museum, the London Library, and the Dulwich Picture Gallery.

He is a founding editor of Ultrabold magazine.

Bibliography 

Some of his books are:

 Type: The Secret History of Letters 
 Type is Beautiful: The Story of Fifty Remarkable Fonts 
 Printer's Devil: The Life and Work of Frederic Warde 
 La historia secreta de las letras 
 Believe Me, I Am: Selected Letters of Frederic Warde
 Emery Walker: Arts, craft, and a world in motion

References

External links
 

British writers
Living people
Year of birth missing (living people)